The Hellenic Statistical Authority, known by its acronym ELSTAT, is the national statistical service of Greece.

The purpose of ELSTAT is to produce, on a regular basis, official statistics, as well as to conduct statistical surveys which:
 cover all the fields of activity of the public and private sector,
 underpin the processes for decision making, policy drawing and evaluating the policies of the Government and the public administrations and services (evaluation indicators),
 are submitted to international agencies in compliance with the obligations of the country and
 concern the general public or specific categories of users of statistics in Greece and abroad

In accordance with its establishing law, ELSTAT is an independent authority and it is not subject to the control of any governmental bodies or other administrative authority. Its operation is subject to the control of the Hellenic Parliament.

History 
The agency was originally established as the National Statistical Service of Greece (Εθνική Στατιστική Υπηρεσία Ελλάδος) in 1956 by Legislative Decree 3627/1956. In 1986, Presidential Decree 224/1986 it was transformed into the General Secretariat of the National Statistical Service of Greece and became part of the Ministry of National Economy. Law 2392/1996 provided for the arrangement of issues concerning the access of the General Secretariat of the National Statistical Service of Greece to administrative sources and files, as well as statistical confidentiality issues.

On 20 October 2009, the new finance minister in the newly elected Cabinet of George Papandreou announced that Greece's budget deficit was expected to reach ~12.5% of GDP. On 8 January 2010, the European Commission published its report 'Report on Greek government deficit and debt statistics'.

On 23 April 2010 Prime Minister George Papandreou formally requested an international bailout for Greece. The European Union (EU), European Central Bank (ECB) and International Monetary Fund (IMF) agreed to participate in the bailout. On 2 May 2010, the IMF, Papandreou, and other Eurozone PMs agreed to the first bailout package for €110 billion ($143 billion) over 3 years. The third austerity package was announced by the Greek government.

As recommended by Eurostat, ESYE was dissolved and replaced by ELSTAT in July 2010 via  Law 3832/2010 (amended since by Laws 3842/2010, 3899/2010, 3943/2011, 3965/2011, 4047/2012 and 4072/2012).

Overview 
The Hellenic Statistical Authority collects data pertaining to the population (it is responsible for the conduct of the population census, every 10 years), health and social security, employment and unemployment, education, etc. The statistical data collected by ELSTAT are used by both the Greek State and international organisations (such as UNESCO, the UN, OECD), by enterprises, the scientific community, citizens and others.

ELSTAT employs 740 people working in the central office and in 50 Regional Statistical Offices located in various regions of Greece. The registered office of ELSTAT is in the Municipality of Piraeus.

Management
The President of ELSTAT is Dr Athanasios C. Thanopoulos, who was unanimously proposed for the position of the President by an international Committee of Experts. He assumed the responsibilities of the President of the Hellenic Statistical Authority in February 2016, by virtue of a decision issued by the Minister of Finance.

List of service presidents

National Statistical Service of Greece (ESYE)

General Secretariat of ESYE

Hellenic Statistical Authority (ELSTAT)

Statistics 
ELSTAT announces the results of its statistical surveys, in the Greek and English language, in various publications. Among these publications are:
 Greek Economy which presents the latest key economic information on Greece.
 Living Conditions in Greece which is designed for users of statistics who seek updated information on recent social developments, as well as long-term social trends.
 Greece in figures which presents statistical data providing an updated demographic, social and economic picture of Greece in a clear and comprehensive manner.

Responsibilities
In accordance with article 11 of Law 3832/2010, as in force, ELSTAT has the following responsibilities:
 It establishes and implements the annual statistical programme, produces and disseminates as the “National Statistical Institute”, in compliance to paragraph 1 of article 5 of Regulation (EC) No 223/2009, the official, national and European Statistics of the country, and conducts any kind of regular or ad hoc statistical surveys, censuses and studies.
 It represents Greece as the “National Statistical Institute” in accordance with paragraph 1 of article 5 of the Regulation (EC) No 223/2009 in the services of the European Union and in any other competent international organisation.
 It cooperates with the European Statistical Office – Eurostat and the other services of the European Commission, the National Statistical Institutes of the other Member States and the national authorities defined in the next paragraph, and with other international agencies and organisations on statistical issues and participates in the relevant statistical committees of the European Union and of other international organisations as the “National Statistical Institute”. 
 It sees to the timely, reliable and effective dissemination of statistical information and to the promotion of statistical issues and economic research in the context of the country’s international cooperation.
 It cooperates with public and private agencies in Greece or abroad, such as educational institutions, research centers and non-profit organisations for the promotion of scientific research for statistical issues, the harmonization of methodology and the implementation of the statistical principles of the Hellenic and European Statistical Systems.
 It cooperates and consults with all the other agencies of EL.S.S. on the development of methods and systems for statistical purposes in their domains of responsibility.
 It develops, disseminates and coordinates the implementation of the European Statistics Code of Practice within the frame of EL.S.S. More specifically, it provides consultancy services concerning methodology issues and statistical tools to all other agencies of EL.S.S. and to any other public or private agency and undertakes statistical work on behalf of third parties, public or private agencies in compliance with community and international principles and practices so as a mutually accepted methodology is disseminated and implemented. 
 It teaches its staff and that of other EL.S.S. agencies to acknowledge the principles and methods of production of reliable statistics for the European Statistical System.
 It sees to the continuous upgrading of the human resources available to EL.STAT. through training and seminars.

References

External links
 www.statistics.gr 

Greece
Government agencies of Greece
Government agencies established in 2010
2010 establishments in Greece